Heads is an American-Canadian black comedy directed by Paul Shapiro that originally aired as a TV film.

Plot
Guy Franklin acquires a job at a newspaper in a small town where a series of decapitations have occurred.  Before long, Franklin begins to wonder if the killer is closer than he thinks.

Cast
 Jon Cryer: Guy Franklin
 Nancy Drake: Emily
 Edward Asner: Ab Abbot
 Roddy McDowall: Fibris Drake
 Jennifer Tilly: Tina Abbot

Production
Shooting took place in Manitoba, Canada.

Reception
Tom Bierbaum of Variety called it "entertainingly weird, gross and amusing".  Ray Loynd of the Los Angeles Times called it a "charming oddity" that could never be seen on network television.  TV Guide rated it 2/4 stars and wrote, "Heads may leave viewers scratching theirs, but flaunts a cult-movie sensibility not normally associated with the small-screen fare."

References

External links
 

1994 films
1990s black comedy films
English-language Canadian films
American black comedy films
Films shot in Manitoba
Canadian black comedy films
Canadian drama television films
1994 comedy films
American drama television films
1990s American films
1990s Canadian films